KIIS may refer to:

 KIIS-FM, a radio station (102.7 FM) licensed to Los Angeles, California, United States
 KIIS Network, a network of Australian radio stations including:
 KIIS 106.5, Greater Sydney area
 KIIS 101.1, Greater Melbourne area
 KIIS 97.3, Greater Brisbane area
 KIIS Extra 95.8, a Greek radio station
 KIIS (Thousand Oaks, California), a defunct radio station (850 AM) formerly licensed to serve Thousand Oaks, California, which held the call sign KIIS from 2003 to 2005
 KEIB, a radio station (1150 AM) licensed to serve Los Angeles, California, that held the call sign KIIS from 1970 to 1980 and from 1984 to 1987
 Kentucky Institute for International Studies
 Kyiv International Institute of Sociology